Amorphogynia is a genus of moths in the family Geometridae.

Species
 Amorphogynia inversarius Rebel, 1903
 Amorphogynia necessaria (Zeller, 1849)

References
 Amorphogynia at Markku Savela's Lepidoptera and some other life forms

Bistonini
Geometridae genera